The Tiga GC289 is a sports prototype race car, designed, developed, and built by British manufacturer Tiga Race Cars, for sports car racing, conforming to the Group C2/IMSA GTP Lights rules and regulations, in 1989.

References

Sports prototypes
Group C cars